Henderson Bay is a bay on the Aupouri Peninsula, near the very top of the North Island in New Zealand. It is on the eastern side of the peninsula next to the Pacific Ocean and 7 km off New Zealand State Highway 1, 66 km south of Cape Reinga and 10 km north of Houhora.  A gravel road connects the bay to the highway.

Recreation 
Henderson Bay is popular for surfing. It has consistent surf, with the beach and reef both having left and right hand breaks, however submerged rocks are a hazard.

History 
There is evidence that New Zealand's biggest tsunami took place at Henderson Bay between 1450 and 1480AD, leaving deposits more than 30 metres above sea level and reaching about a kilometre inland from the coast.

References 

Far North District
Bays of the Northland Region